Hear is the seventh studio album released by American-born, Australian-based hard rocker, Diesel. It was nominated for Best Independent Release at the ARIA Music Awards of 2003, but lost to Up All Night by the Waifs.

Track listing

All tracks written by Diesel (a.k.a. Mark Lizotte) except where noted.
 "Angel Face" – 3:09
 "Faith and Gasoline" – 3:40
 "Getta Kick" (Diesel, Guy Davies) – 3:55
 "She's High" – 3:27
 "Brighter than the Sun" (Diesel, Davies) – 4:18
 "Battleworn" – 4:15
 "Don't Send Another" (Diesel, G. Wattenberg) – 2:26
 "I'm Here" (Diesel, Lee Moloney, Richie Vez, Rob Woolf) – 4:45
 "On Your Sand" (Diesel, Moloney, Vez, Woolf) – 3:50
 "Lotion" (Diesel, Davies) – 4:17
 "The Embers" – 3:27
 "I Wanna Fly" – 3:54

Personnel

 Diesel – vocals, guitar, cello and bass (tracks 3, 5, 12)
 Lee Moloney – drums, percussion
 Richie Vez – bass guitar
 Rob Woolf – keyboards, backing vocals (track 8)

Additional musicians
 Guy Davies – keyboards and programming (tracks 3, 5), backing vocals (track 3)
 Gary Pinto – backing vocals (track 2)

Graphics
 Design, layout – artofthestate.com.au
 Photography – Tracy Stevenson

Recording details
 Producer – Diesel and Craig Porteils (except track 3), Diesel, Porteils and Guy Davies (track 3); at Eargasm and Studios 301, Sydney
 Mixer – Craig Porteils at Studios 301
 Mastering – Leon Zervos at Masterdisk, NYC
 Assistant engineer – Nick Cervanaro

External links

References

2002 albums
Diesel (musician) albums